Czarnocin  is a village in Kazimierza County, Świętokrzyskie Voivodeship, in south-central Poland. It is the seat of the gmina (administrative district) called Gmina Czarnocin.

The village has an approximate population of 470.

References

Villages in Kazimierza County
Kielce Governorate
Kielce Voivodeship (1919–1939)